Darren Bailey (born March 17, 1966) is an American far-right politician who was a Republican member of the Illinois Senate for the 55th district. Previously, he was a member of the Illinois House of Representatives for the 109th district in Southern Illinois. He was the Republican nominee for the 2022 Illinois gubernatorial election, which he lost to incumbent J. B. Pritzker.

Early life and education
Bailey was born in Louisville, Illinois, on March 17, 1966. He graduated from North Clay High School and earned an Associate of Science degree in Agricultural Production from Lake Land College.

Political career
Bailey, of Xenia, Illinois, was a member of the North Clay Board of Education.

In a rare victory for candidates supported by Dan Proft's Liberty Principles PAC, Bailey defeated David Reis in the 2018 Republican primary. Bailey then defeated Democratic candidate Cynthia Given, the Secretary of the Richland County Democratic Party, by a margin of 76.14% to 23.86%. The 109th district at the time, located in the Illinois Wabash Valley, included all of Edwards, Jasper, Richland, Wabash, Wayne, and White counties and parts of Effingham and Lawrence counties.

On July 8, 2019, Bailey announced his intention to run for the Illinois Senate seat being vacated by Dale Righter. He won the March 17, 2020, Republican primary. Bailey defeated Democratic Party candidate Cynthia Given in the general election.

In April 2020, Bailey sued Governor J. B. Pritzker, claiming that the governor's stay-at-home order extension to mitigate effects of the COVID-19 pandemic was unfairly affecting residents of Clay County. A judge granted a temporary restraining order against the stay-at-home order, though it only applied to Bailey. Pritzker stated he would appeal the order and characterized Bailey's lawsuit as a "cheap political stunt." On May 20, 2020, the Illinois House voted 81–27 to remove Bailey from its session for refusing to wear a mask. The following day, Bailey attended the House wearing a face mask as required by the rules.

On February 22, 2021, Bailey announced his candidacy for governor of Illinois in the 2022 gubernatorial election. On December 13, 2021, Bailey announced that his running mate for Lieutenant Governor would be former WLS-AM 890 talk radio host Stephanie Trussell. Three days before the primary, he appeared at a rally with Donald Trump and he received his endorsement.

Bailey won the primary by a large margin, receiving 57.7% of the vote and winning every county except two.

Before a campaign appearance on July 4, 2022, in the wake of the Highland Park Parade Shooting, Bailey stated on a livestream "The shooter is still at large, so let's pray for justice to prevail, and then let's move on and let's celebrate - celebrate the independence of this nation". He received backlash for his statement and later apologized. For his gubernatorial campaign, Bailey has received more than $50M in support from cardboard box businessman Dick Uihlein.

Bailey currently serves on the following committees: Agriculture (Minority Spokesperson); Education; Energy and Public Utilities; Health; Higher Education; Labor; Subcommittee on Public Health; App- Agriculture, Envir. & Energy; App- Higher Education; App-Human Services; App- Personnel and Procurement; Redistricting- E Central & SE IL.

Political positions 
Bailey holds far-right political views. He is anti-abortion. As a state lawmaker, Bailey has voted against abortion rights measures. He praised the Supreme Court's 2022 decision to overturn Roe v. Wade. He supports a statewide ban on abortion except in cases where the mother's life is in danger. He opposes abortion in cases of rape or incest. In a video posted on Facebook in 2017, Bailey said "the attempted extermination of the Jews of World War II doesn’t even compare on a shadow of the life that has been lost with abortion since its legalization".

Darren Bailey strongly opposes the SAFE-T Act, a bill signed into law by Governor J.B. Pritzker that, among other things, ended mandatory cash bail in Illinois. Bailey has referred to the act as "radical, pro-criminal legislation."

In 2019, Bailey and seven other Republicans sponsored a resolution calling for the City of Chicago to become its own state, claiming that "the majority of residents in downstate Illinois disagree with City of Chicago residents on key issues such as gun ownership, abortion, immigration, and other policy issues." This was not the first time such a resolution was introduced, but it had little chance of passing, and some of the sponsors stated they did not actually intend to separate Chicago. With the announcement of Bailey's bid for governor, Bailey backtracked, calling it "an old resolution" and "a warning shot" targeted towards Chicago.

Following the 2020 presidential election, Bailey refused to acknowledge that Joe Biden fairly defeated Donald Trump, stating that he “did not know” if Trump's disproven claims of voter fraud were legitimate.

Electoral history

Personal life
Bailey is married to Cindy Stortzum, and they have four children and multiple grandchildren. He owns a family farm. Bailey and his wife run a private Christian school.

References

External links

 Official profile from the Illinois General Assembly
101st, 102nd
 Constituent website
 Campaign website
 

1966 births
21st-century American politicians
Farmers from Illinois
Republican Party Illinois state senators
Living people
Republican Party members of the Illinois House of Representatives
People from Clay County, Illinois
School board members in Illinois
Far-right politicians in the United States